Lennart Gripenberg  (15 September 1852 in Oulu - 14 September 1933) was a Finnish politician. He was a member of the Senate of Finland.

1852 births
1933 deaths
People from Oulu
Swedish-speaking Finns
Finnish senators
Members of the Diet of Finland